Aleksander Arendt (6 December 1912, in Będargowo – 2002) was an activist of the Kashubians and Pomeranians (ethnic groups in northern Poland). He was the president of Kashubian-Pomeranian Association in years 1956–1959.

1912 births
2002 deaths
People from Wejherowo County
20th-century Polish politicians
Pomeranian Griffin members
People from West Prussia